Eastern Air Lines Shuttle Flight 1320, carrying passengers from Newark to Boston, was hijacked around 7:30 p.m. on March 17, 1970, by John J. Divivo who was armed with a .38 caliber revolver. Captain Robert Wilbur Jr., 35, a former United States Air Force pilot who had been promoted to captain six months prior, was shot in his arm by the suicidal hijacker. Despite his wounds, he flew his aircraft safely to a landing while talking to air traffic control, telling them his copilot was shot and needed emergency services. His copilot, James Hartley, 30, was shot and collapsed. Despite being mortally wounded, Hartley was able to force the gun from Divivo's hand, and shoot the would-be hijacker three times before lapsing into unconsciousness, and eventual death. Despite his injuries, Divivo arose and began clawing at Captain Wilbur, attempting to force a crash. Wilbur hit Divivo over the head with the gun he had retrieved from the center console. The pilot was able to land the plane safely at Logan International Airport, and the hijacker was arrested. On October 31, 1970, Divivo hanged himself while awaiting trial at Charles Street Jail.

The incident was the first aircraft hijacking in the United States to end with a fatality.

See also 

 Federal Express Flight 705 – 1994 incident involving a suicidal hijacker who was overpowered by an airline flight crew
 List of accidents and incidents involving commercial aircraft

References

Further reading
 
 

1970 in Boston
1970 murders in the United States
Aviation accidents and incidents in the United States in 1970
Terrorist incidents in the United States in 1970
March 1970 events in the United States
Aircraft hijackings in the United States
1320
Accidents and incidents involving the McDonnell Douglas DC-9
Crimes in Massachusetts
Aviation accidents and incidents in Massachusetts
Logan International Airport